The PSU Urban Center stations are light rail stations on the MAX Green, Orange and Yellow Lines in downtown Portland, Oregon, United States, located adjacent to the PSU Urban Center, of Portland State University. The northbound platform is the PSU Urban Center/Southwest 6th & Montgomery station, and the southbound platform is the PSU Urban Center/Southwest 5th & Mill station. The stations opened on August 30, 2009, and for the next three years they were temporarily the southern passenger terminus of the Portland Transit Mall MAX extension, awaiting construction of the PSU South stations.  The latter opened on September 2, 2012, and the change made PSU Urban Center the second stop northbound and the next-to-last stop southbound on the Portland Mall MAX lines.

The stations are built into the sidewalks of 5th and 6th Avenue. There are connections to the Portland Streetcar's NS Line and A and B Loop lines, and TriMet and C-Tran buses.

When opened in August 2009, the stations were located in Fareless Square (within fare zone 1), which was renamed the Free Rail Zone four months later, in January 2010. However, the fare-free zone was eliminated in 2012, when TriMet discontinued all use of fare zones.

References

External links
SW 5th & Mill station (southbound) information from TriMet
SW 6th & Montgomery station (northbound) information from TriMet
MAX Light Rail Stations – more general TriMet page

2009 establishments in Oregon
MAX Light Rail double stations
MAX Green Line
MAX Yellow Line
Portland State University campus
Railway stations in the United States at university and college campuses
Railway stations in the United States opened in 2009
Railway stations in Portland, Oregon